Coiled-coil domain-containing protein 135, also known as CCDC135, is a protein that in humans is encoded by the CCDC135 gene.

Gene
CCDC90B is located on chromosome 16 in humans. It is neighbored by:

 GPR97, G protein-coupled receptor 97.
 GPR56, encodes a member of the G protein coupled receptor family (G protein-coupled receptor 56). The gene is implicated in the regulation of brain cortical patterning. The protein binds specifically to transglutaminase 2 in the extracellular space.
 KATNB1, katanin p80 subunit B 1. An accessory protein that helps targets the enzyme to the centrosome.
 KIFC3, kinesin family member C3 isoform 3. KIFC3 belongs to the large superfamily of kinesins, molecular motors that use the energy of ATP hydrolysis to translocate cargoes along microtubules.

Protein

Structure
This protein is characterized by the presence of two domains.

 Nuclear localization sequence with a Score of 4 in the amino acids 265–279. The amino acid sequence for this region is:
KKQQEIRAQEKKRLR

 Transglutaminase-like family with an E Value of 0.0018 in the amino acids 149–308. The amino acid sequence for this region is:
CAQFVSDFLTMVPLPDPLKPPSHLYSSTTVLKYQKGNCFDFSTLLCSMLIGSGYDAYCVNGYGSLDLCHMDLTREVCPLTVKPKETIKKEEK
VLPKKYTIKPPRDLCSRFEQEQEVKKQQEIRAQEKKRLREEEERLMEAEKAKPDALHGLRVHSWVLVL

The protein has 17 predicted alpha helices sites, a characteristic of coiled-coil proteins, and 1 predicted beta-pleated sheet. The following image shows the predicted regions of alpha helices and beta pleated sheets by two programs STRAP and Quickphyre:
Note: the consensus secondary structures are shown. This was carried out by constructing a multiple sequence alignment of the proteins with their secondary structures (as shown below). The predicted regions were then cross checked with the Quickphyre Program.

Homology 

LRRC57 is exceedingly well conserved, as shown in the sequence annotation to the right. The sequence annotation was created using 20 orthologs shown in the table below and was prepared using ClustalX2 and ClustalW (a tool at Biology Workbench).

The following table provides a few details on orthologs of the human version of CCDC135. These orthologs were gathered from BLAT. and BLAST searches

Predicted properties
Molecular weight: 103502.53 = 103484.53 + 18 kDa
Isoelectric point: 5.358000
Transmembrane helices: None
Post-translation modifications:
Chloroplast transit peptides:  None
Signal pepties:  Yes 
Nuclear Localization Sequence: KKQQEIRAQEKKRLR
C-mannosylation sites:  None (However, 14 sites with scores lower than the threshold were predicted.)
Mitochondrial targeting: None
N-glycosylation sites:  Yes
Sequence gi|223941912 at positions 100 and 493 with potentials of 0.7200 and 0.6031 receptively.

Cellular location
CCDC135 is predicted to be a Cytosol/Nuclear protein with no transmembrane spans or segments. It is predicted to contain at least 56 specific phosphorylation sites which include: 20 Protein Kinase C Phosphorylation sites, 11 Casein Kinase II Phosphorylation sites, and 8 cAMP/cGMP Dependent Phosphorylation sites.
The amino acid sequence is also predicted to contain 10 sumoylation sites at positions K236, K236, K45, K773, K499, K679, K249, K167, K540, K445, and K292.

Function
The function of CCDC135 is not yet well understood but it is thought to be involved in teratospermia.

References

Genes on human chromosome 16
Human proteins